is a Japanese politician. A former two-term mayor of Akita City in Akita Prefecture, first elected in 2001, he is currently the Governor of Akita Prefecture after winning election on April 12, 2009. He is the 21st head of the North Satake branch of the Satake clan.

Life

Early life and family 
Satake was born into the Wainai family, and his biological great grandfather was Wainai Sadayuki. He was later adopted to the North Satake family, a noble family that held the title of baron until 1945, when the nobility was abolished in Japan. The Satake family had formerly served as daimyo (feudal lord) of Kubota Domain. He is the 21st head of the North Satake family.

He is a native of Senboku, Akita, formerly known as Kakunodate Village in Senboku District. He graduated from Tohoku University in 1971, with a B.E. degree in Precision Engineering.

Career 
After graduating from Tohoku University, he joined the Akita Prefectural Office in 1972 and held a series of positions until 1997. In that year, he helped to establish the Regional Economic Research Council.

Later in July 2001, he won his first of two elections for the post of Mayor of Akita City. During his time in office, he was also the chairman and vice-chairman of the National Mayors Association of Japan and the Governmental Select Committee on Taxation.

While still Mayor of Akita City, he became a candidate for Governor of Akita Prefecture in February 2009. Though being a political independent, he earned the support of the local Liberal Democratic Party Alliance and the Social Democratic Party Alliance in Akita Prefecture. He won election for the post over several other candidates on April 12, 2009.

Personality 
Satake has said to love cats. During his time as Mayor of Akita, he kept five cats at the official residence.

References 

 
 
 Almost daily Itoi Shimbun Nice to meet you, governor of Akita Prefecture. I'm here to talk about cats!(Japanese)

1947 births
Living people
Politicians from Akita Prefecture
Tohoku University alumni
Mayors of places in Japan
Satake clan
Governors of Akita Prefecture